The Kenya Union Party (KUP) is a political party in Kenya.

History 
The party was founded in 2021 by Governor of West Pokot County John Krop Lonyangapuo and David Pkosing.

The party was one of 23 that contested the 2022 Kenyan general election as part of the Azimio La Umoja alliance. 3 were elected to the 13th Parliament of Kenya. After the election they dismissed claims of a change to Kenya Kwanza.

Elected representatives

MPs

Governors 

 John Krop Lonyangapuo

References

See also 

 List of political parties in Kenya

Political parties in Kenya
2021 establishments in Kenya
Political parties established in 2021